The Central Market (also known as the Old Bazaar is a city market and trade enterprise in Rostov-on-Don. It is unofficially known as «Starbaz» (. Its official name during the Soviet period was the "Andreyevsky District Market". It is currently officially known as "CJSC «Central market» of Rostov-on-Don".

Geography 
The market is situated in the city's  district, one of the oldest in the city. Besides its role as an "urban area for trade in provision and other supplies on the outside", the market is a historic site.

Occupants 

The latter had been a shop, and is an object of architectural and cultural heritage, built in the classical style. The Maksimov House, the home of grain merchant P. R. Maksimov, also occupies the site. It was built in the first half of the 19th century, to the design of architect Trofim Sharzhinsky. It was one of the city's first stone buildings. P. E. Chekhov, father of the writer and playwright Anton Chekhov, is believed to have worked there as a clerk and a merchant.

History 
In part thanks to its central bazaar, Rostov-on-Don developed and flourished as a merchant city for a long period. The history of the city dates back to 15 December 1749 when an imperial decree was issued on the establishment of a customs office at the mouth of the Temernik river. The market in Rostov-on-Don is first mentioned in historical documents from the 1840s, though it dates from earlier than this. In the beginning of the 18th century a small wooden chapel was consecrated in honour of the Nativity of Mary, which came to be connected with the future market.

In 1820 a wooden Gostiny dvor was built on the site to the design of Trofim Sharzhinsky, marking the beginning of the architectural ensemble of the Central Market. It became known as the Old Bazaar after the construction of the New Bazaar, which specialized in non-food products, in 1840. The New Bazaar was completely destroyed by fire in 1905 during Anti-Jewish pogroms. It reopened in 1906, possibly in a different location than its previous site, but this has not been recorded.

In 1860, the dilapidated wooden Chapel of the Nativity of the Blessed Virgin Mary was replaced with the stone Cathedral of the Nativity of the Blessed Virgin Mary. It was designed by academician Konstantin Thon and its construction was sponsored by local merchants S. N. Koshkin and F. N. Mikhailov. A four-tiered bell tower was built in 1878 to the design of architect .

Construction of the three indoor halls was completed by 1893. Urban architect  designed the market. The designs of the second and third indoor halls were demonstrated at a 1896 fair in Nizhny Novgorod where they were awarded gold medals and became a standard for Russian markets. Only the third hall is extant. It has been renovated and bears name of "Commodity hall №1 of CSJC «Central market»". The other two indoor halls and the bell tower were destroyed during the Great Patriotic War by German bombers. In the 1960s a meat hall was built over the ruins. After being reconstructed between 1989 and 1990 it became a well-known landmark.

References 

Buildings and structures in Rostov-on-Don
Tourist attractions in Rostov-on-Don
Retail markets in Russia